Anaximenes of Miletus ("King's Power") was an Ancient Greek, Ionian Pre-Socratic philosopher from Miletus in Asia Minor (modern-day Turkey), active in the latter half of the 6th century BC. The Anaximenes crater on the Moon is named in his honor. 

He was the last of the three philosophers of the Milesian School, considered the first philosophers of the Western world. Anaximenes is best known and identified as a younger friend or student of Anaximander, who was himself taught by the very first philosopher Thales, one of the Seven Sages of Greece.  Thales proposed all was made of water; Anaximander proposed all was made of apeiron or something indefinite rather than something specific, and Anaximenes proposed all was made of air. More condensed air made for colder, denser objects and more rarefied air made for hotter, lighter objects.

The life and views of Anaximenes remain obscure as none of his work has been preserved, and he is only known through comments about him made by later writers. His cosmological views seem similar to his two Milesian predecessors. Anaximenes thought that the earth was flat and tilted, with the shape of a table-top, and floated on air. The other celestial bodies were also flat and supported by air.

Biography

Anaximenes of Miletus was the son of Eurystratos. He is the third philosopher in the Western tradition, considered a pupil of Anaximander, who was a pupil of Thales, who was one of the Seven Sages of Greece. He is given the number 13 in the Diels–Kranz numbering. 

His dates are lost to history. Anaximenes is considered the younger pupil of Anaximander, and old enough to have influenced Pythagoras. Apollodorus of Damascus estimated Anaximenes' lifespan as having flourished during the same time period in which the Persian King Cyrus the Great defeated the Lydian King Croesus at the Battle of Thymbra and subsequent Siege of Sardis in 546 BC.  

The typical age for one's acme of 40 is assumed for when one was 'fluorishing' placing his birth at 586 BC. Further, the Eclipse of Thales in 585 BC is used to date when Thales fluorished, and Anaximenes was born around when Thales 'fluorished' and 'fluorished' when Thales died.

According to classicist John Burnet, he was in his time a more important figure than his teacher Anaximander. Some of Anaximenes' writings are referenced during the Hellenistic Age, but no record of these documents currently exist. Further details of his life and philosophical views are obscure as none of his work has been preserved, and he is only known through fragments and interpretations of him made by later writers and polemicists, such as Aristotle.

Air as the Arche

According to Aristotle, and his follower Theophrastus (as relayed by Simplicius), each philosopher of the Milesian School was a material monist who sought to discover the arche; the one, underlying basis of everything. Aristotle called the first philosophers "physicists". Anaximenes thought air was the primary substance that held the universe together. Or literally aer, which may also include mist or vapor. 

Anaximenes views were seen to reconcile the views of his two predecessors, Thales and Anaximander. Air had the feature of being one (like with Thales, who believed it was water), and infinite (like with Anaximander, who thought it was apeiron), but determinate, like Thales and unlike Anaximander. It was also seen as the substance most capable of change, for he also saw air as always in motion.

As well as specific, infinite and dynamic, he believed that air was divine. He identified air with the "breath of life" and thus the soul as well as the air in the atmosphere. Only a single quote by Anaximenes survives: “Just as our soul...being air holds us together, so pneuma and air encompass [and guard] the whole world.” This is the first extant source to use the word pneuma (“breath”).

Condensation and rarefaction

Anaximenes seemed to base his conclusions on naturally observable phenomena in the water cycle, the processes of rarefaction and condensation. Anaximenes attributed cold/wet air to be due to condensation, hot/dry air to be due to rarefaction. This can be classically illustrated by blowing on one's hand with pursed lips and feeling cold air, or with an open mouth and feeling warm air.

Anaximenes figured this difference in the degree of condensation and density of air further produced all matter. When air condenses it becomes visible, and according to Anaximenes, the spread-out, invisible, infinite air was condensed to wind, then formed into clouds, which condensed further to produce mist, rain, and other forms of precipitation. The process continued until the air was condensed or felted enough to form solids like dirt and ultimately stones. By contrast, just as water evaporates into air, air was further rarefied into fire or light.

While Thales and Anaximander also recognized transitions in states of matter, Anaximenes was the first to associate the qualitative change in hot/dry and cold/wet pairings with the quantitative density of a single material.

Cosmology
Anaximenes also used air to explain the nature of the earth and the surrounding celestial bodies. Air condensed to create the flat disk of the earth, which he said was shaped like a table, and was tilted. According to Aristotle in On the Heavens, by Anaximenes's lights the world stayed still by floating like a lid covering the air beneath it.  

He said the Sun was shaped like a leaf and also floated on air. He thought of stars being similar to nails that are stuck in a transparent shell.  In keeping with the prevailing view of stars as balls of fire in the sky, Anaximenes proposed that the earth let out an exhalation of air that rarefied, ignited and became the stars. While the sun is similarly described as being aflame, it is not composed of rarefied air like the stars, but rather of earth like the moon; its burning comes not from its composition but rather from its rapid motion.  

In his theory, according to the Christian polemicist Hippolytus in Refutation of All Heresies, when the sun sets it does not pass under the earth, but is merely obscured by higher parts of the earth as it circles around and becomes more distant. Hippolytus likens the motion of the sun and the other celestial bodies around the earth to the way that a cap may be turned around the head. Anaximenes believed that the sky was a dome, and day and night are caused by celestial bodies being carried North until they are no longer seen. There is evidence that suggests Anaximenes may have been the first person to distinguish between planets and fixed stars.

Weather and other natural phenomena
Anaximenes provided causes for other natural phenomena on the earth as well. Earthquakes, he asserted, were the result either of lack of moisture, which causes the earth to break apart because of how parched it is, or of superabundance of water, which also causes cracks in the earth. In either case the earth becomes weakened by its cracks, so that hills collapse and cause earthquakes. Lightning is similarly caused by the violent separation of clouds by the wind, creating a bright, fire-like flash. Rainbows, on the other hand, are formed when densely compressed air is touched by the rays of the sun.

Death and legacy

The traditional age to guess for his death is at 60 years old. He could not have lived well into the 5th Century BC, for he was getting old and Miletus was captured by the Persian army in 494 BC.

The Anaximenes crater on the Moon is named in his honor.

Influence on philosophy

Pre-Socratic philosophy 
The theories of Anaximenes were likely influential upon later Presocratic philosophers. Perhaps because of the aforementioned capture of Miletus in 494 BC, philosophy seemed to shift focus to Italy before coming back to Asia Minor.

Similarly to Anaximenes, the Pythagoreans in Italy, according to Aristotle, believed the world breathed; that there was "boundless breath" which was "outside the heavens, and … was inhaled by the world". 

The cosmology of Anaxagoras back in Asia MInor shared many similarities with that of Anaximenes, and was likely influenced by it, while the atomists Democritus and Leucippus adopted Anaximenes' view that the world was flat. Diogenes of Apollonia attempted to amalgamate the theories of Anaximenes with those of Anaxagoras. He took up the view of Anaximenes' that air was the arche, that it was the governing force and the source of everything in creation, and that all substances were the result of the condensation and rarefaction of air.

Plato and Aristotle 
In the Timaeus, Plato favorably mentions Anaximenes's theory of matter and its seven states from stone to fire. Plato treats Anaximenes as a kind of philosopher of process rather than a material monist, as Aristotle portrays him. From this perspective, Anaximenes can be seen as a forerunner of Heraclitus and ultimately Plato, moreso than of Diogenes of Apollonia. Plato may be referencing Anaximenes in the Phaedo when he states  "And so one man makes the earth stay below the heavens by putting a vortex about it, and another regards the earth as a flat trough supported on a foundation of air."

Notes

References

Citations

Sources

Further reading

External links

 Anaximenes at the Internet Encyclopedia of Philosophy
 Anaximenes of Miletus Life and Work - Fragments and Testimonies by Giannis Stamatellos

6th-century BC Greek people
6th-century BC philosophers
Ancient Milesians
Philosophers of ancient Ionia
Presocratic philosophers